Harms surname. Notable people with the surname include:

 Chris Harms (born 1956), Australian cricketer
 Claus Harms (1778–1855), German evangelical minister
 Daniil Harms (1905–1942), English transcription: Daniil Kharms, Russian writer
 Friedrich Harms (1819–1880), German philosopher
 Hermann Harms (1870–1942), German botanist
 Johann Oswald Harms (1643–1708), German painter, engraver and scenic designer
 Lars Harms (born 1977), Swiss squash player
 Lars Harms (born 1964), German politician
 Monika Harms (born 1946), German Attorney General
 Rebecca Harms (born 1956), German politician and filmmaker
 Robert W. Harms (born 1946), American historian
 Ruud Harms (born 1968), Dutch footballer
 Robert T. Harms (1932 – 2016), American linguist

See also
 Harms (policy debate), policy debate stock issue
 T.B. Harms & Francis, Day & Hunter, Inc., an American music publisher

German-language surnames
Patronymic surnames
Russian Mennonite surnames

hr:Harms